Spešov is a municipality and village in Blansko District in the South Moravian Region of the Czech Republic. It has about 600 inhabitants.

Notable people
František Trávníček (1888–1961), slavist and bohemist

References

Villages in Blansko District